Carnegie (Neg) Clark (1881–1959) was a champion golfer, golf club manufacturer, a golf course architect and an organiser of professional golf in Australia.

Early life 
Clark was born on 27 July 1881 in Carnoustie, Scotland. He was a member of The Carnoustie Golf Club.

Golf champion
Clark won the following golf tournaments: 
 1906 Australian Open at Royal Sydney Golf Club
 1908 Australian PGA Championship at The Australian Golf Club
 1909 Australian PGA Championship at Oakleigh Golf Club, (Oakleigh, Victoria)  
 1910 Australian Open at Royal Adelaide Golf Club
 1911 Australian Open at Royal Sydney Golf Club
 1924 Sun Tournament at Royal Sydney Golf Club

Golf course architect
Clark designed the following golf courses:
 1904: The Australian Golf Club with Jock Hutchison and Gilbert Martin
 1920: Royal Queensland Golf Club
 1926: Moore Park Golf Club, Sydney NSW
 1936: Moss Vale Golf Club, Moss Vale NSW

Professional golf in Australia
In 1911, Carnegie Clark organised a workshop at Royal Sydney Golf Club which resulted in the foundation of the Professional Golfers Association of Australia. Clark was its founding treasurer and served as president in 1920–1921.

Later life 
Clark retired in May 1930. He died on 3 February 1959 aged 77 years.

References

Scottish male golfers
Australian male golfers
Golf course architects
Golf administrators
Golfers from Carnoustie
Sportspeople from Angus, Scotland
Scottish emigrants to Australia
1881 births
1959 deaths